Ulupi, also known as Uluchi and Ulupika, is a character the Hindu epic Mahabharata. She is a Naga princess, the daughter of the king Kauravya, and is among the four wives of Arjuna. She also finds a mention in the Vishnu Purana and the Bhagavata Purana.

Ulupi is said to have met and married Arjuna when he was in exile, and with whom she bore his son Iravan. She played a major part in the upbringing of Babruvahana, Arjuna's son with Chitrangada. She is also credited with redeeming Arjuna from the curse of the Vasus by restoring his life after he was slain in a battle by Babruvahana.

Etymology and form
Little is said about Ulupi in the Mahabharata. Ulupi is known by numerous names in the Mahabharata—Bhujagātmajā, Bhujagendrakanyakā, Bhujagottamā Kauravī, Kauravyaduhitā, Kauravyakulanandinī, Pannaganandinī, Pannagasutā, Pannagātmajā, Pannageśvarakanyā, Pannagī, and Uragātmajā.

Ulupi is described as a mythical form of a Nāgakanyā (Nāga princess), half-maiden and half-serpent. Michael Mott in his Caverns, Cauldrons, and Concealed Creatures described Ulupi as "partly reptilian" – the portion below the waist resembles that of a snake or a crocodile.

Early life
Ulupi was the daughter of the Naga King Kauravya. Her father ruled the underwater kingdom of serpents in the Ganga river. She was a well-trained warrior.

Marriage with Arjuna

Arjuna, the third Pandava brother, was exiled from Indraprastha, the capital city of the kingdom, to go on a twelve-year pilgrimage as a penance for violating the terms of his marriage to Draupadi, the brothers' common wife. Accompanied by Brahmins, Arjuna went to the north eastern region of present-day India.

One day, when Arjuna was bathing in the Ganga river to perform his rituals, the Naga princess Ulupi, grasps him and pulls him into the river. She holds him with her hands and forces him to travel under her will. They finally end up in an underwater kingdom, the abode of Kauravya. Arjuna comes across a sacrificial fire there and offers his rites to the fire. Agni is pleased with Arjuna's unhesitating offering of oblations.

Still smiling, Arjuna enquires Ulupi about her background, to which she responds thus:

Arjuna, however, declines her proposal citing his celibacy on his pilgrimage. Ulupi argues that his celibacy is limited only to Draupadi, Arjuna's first wife. Convinced by her argument, Arjuna marries her, spending the night in the mansion of the Naga and rose with the sun in the morning. Later, a son named Iravan was born to them. Pleased by Arjuna, Ulupi grants him a boon that every amphibious creature shall, without doubt, be capable of being vanquished by him.

Redeeming Arjuna from the curse

The Vasus, Bhishma's brothers, cursed Arjuna after he killed Bhishma through treachery in the Kurukshetra War. When Ulupi heard of the curse, she sought the help of her father, Kauravya. Her father went to the river goddess Ganga, Bhishma's mother, and requested her for a relief from the curse. Upon hearing him, Ganga said that Arjuna would be killed by his own son, Babruvahana—Arjuna's son through Chitrangada—and brought back to life when Ulupi placed a gem called Nagamani on his chest.

Following her father's advice, Ulupi instigates Babruvāhana to fight Arjuna. When Arjuna goes to Manipur with the horse intended for the Ashvamedha sacrifice, the king Babruvahana, as directed by Ulupi, challenges Arjuna to a duel. In the fierce battle that took place between them, both are mangled by the other's arrows. Finally, Arjuna is mortally wounded and is killed by his son when he shoots a powerful arrow at him. Chitrangada rushes to the spot and abuses Ulupi for instigating Babruvahana to fight Arjuna. Repenting of his deed, Babruvahana is determined to kill himself, but is promptly stopped by Ulupi. She goes to her kingdom and brings the Nagamani. When she places the Nagamani on Arjuna's chest, his life is restored, thus relieving him of the Vasus' curse. When brought back to his life, Arjuna becomes happy to see Ulupi, Chitrangada, and Babruvahana. He takes all of them to Hastinapura.

Retirement of the Pandavas
Upon the onset of the Kali Yuga, the Pandavas along with Draupadi retired and left the throne to their only heir Arjuna's grandson, Parikshit. Giving up all their belongings and ties, they made their final journey of pilgrimage to the Himalayas, accompanied by a dog. Ulupi went back to her kingdom in the Ganga river.

References

Bibliography

 
 
 
 
 
 

Characters in the Mahabharata
Nāgas